The seventh season of television drama series Wentworth premiered on Fox Showcase in Australia on 28 May 2019. It is executive produced by FremantleMedia's director of drama, Jo Porter. The seventh season picks up a few months after the events of last season's finale, the presumed closure of the case of Joan Ferguson and the subsequent arrest of former acting Governor, Derek Channing.

This season introduces multiple new recurring characters, Dr. Greg Miller (David de Lautour), Sean Brody (Rick Donald), Narelle Stang (Morgana O'Reilly), and Kylee Webb (Geraldine Hakewill).

Plot 
With the case of Joan Ferguson presumably closed, a significantly pregnant Vera and her co-conspirators in the Freak's demise, Will and Jake, are off the hook... at least for now. Meanwhile, Wentworth's eclectic mix of misfits are fracturing as the powers of love, deception and revenge threaten to break them apart for good. The onset of dementia finds Liz clutching at any semblance of hope, while Boomer has to deal with her feelings after the break-up of her family.

Cast

Main
 Leah Purcell as Rita Connors
 Celia Ireland as Liz Birdsworth
 Katrina Milosevic as Sue "Boomer" Jenkins
 Robbie J Magasiva as Deputy Governor/Acting Governor Will Jackson
 Tammy Macintosh as Kaz Proctor
 Kate Jenkinson as Allie Novak
 Bernard Curry as Jake Stewart
 Rarriwuy Hick as Ruby Mitchell
 Susie Porter as Marie Winter
 Kate Atkinson as Governor Vera Bennett

Special guest
 Nicole da Silva as Franky Doyle
 Pamela Rabe as Joan Ferguson

Recurring
 Jacquie Brennan as Acting Deputy Governor Linda Miles
 David de Lautour as Dr. Greg Miller 
 Morgana O'Reilly as Narelle Stang 
 Lucia Brancastiano as Officer Peta Webb
 Geraldine Hakewill as Kylee Webb 
 Rick Donald as Sean Brody
 Chloe Ng as Nurse Shen
 Artemis Ioannides as Vicky Kosta
 Anni Finsterer as May Jenkins 
 Emily Havea as Mon Alston
 Sarah Hallam as Jen Hutchins
 David Downer as Attorney-General Michael Heston
 Shane Connor as Ray Houser 
 Bert LaBonte as Rodney Gavin
 Thomas Fisher as Artie Donaldson

Episodes

Production
A seventh season was commissioned in April 2018, before the sixth-season premiere, with filming commencing the following week.

Foxtel's head of drama and Wentworth executive producer Penny Win said: "It's hard to believe we are already rolling the cameras on season seven of Wentworth. It feels like only yesterday we were reintroducing Foxtel viewers to such iconic characters like Bea Smith and 'The Freak' Joan Ferguson. The way in which our audience, both locally and internationally, has embraced and connected with the show goes to prove that people will watch, embrace, love and continue to support quality Australian drama.

New cast members joining the show during the season, included Dr. Greg Miller (David de Lautour), Sean Brody (Rick Donald), Narelle Stang (Morgana O'Reilly), and Kylee Webb (Geraldine Hakewill).

Original ending
Season seven of Wentworth was intended to be the final season; however, in December 2018, it was announced that the series was renewed for an additional 20 episodes which will broadcast through 2020 and 2021.

Following the renewal, several scenes from the final episode had to be cut, and new scenes were shot and inserted to lead the story into the eighth season. The cut scenes, which were intended to give closure to the series, included Franky and Bridget with Vera and Baby Grace, while another scene featuring three new prisoners who have arrived at Wentworth (cameo appearances by original Prisoner cast members Val Lehman, Fiona Spence, and Colette Mann who played Bea Smith, Vera Bennett, and Doreen Anderson/Burns, respectively).

Reception

Ratings

Accolades

 AACTA Awards
 Nominated: Best Television Drama Series – Wentworth
 Australian Directors Guild Awards
 Nominated: Best Direction in a TV or SVOD Drama Series – Kevin Carlin for "Under Siege: Part 2"
 Logie Awards
 The Logie Awards for 2020 have been suspended due to the COVID-19 pandemic and will feature as part of the 2021 awards with joint nominations for both seasons seven and eight.

Home media

References

External links 
 

2019 Australian television seasons
Wentworth (TV series)